Propilidium pelseneeri is a species of sea snail, a true limpet, a marine gastropod mollusk in the family Lepetidae, one of the families of true limpets.

References

Lepetidae
Gastropods described in 1912